The Division of Tasmania was an Australian electoral division covering Tasmania. The five-member statewide seat existed from the inaugural 1901 election until the 1903 election. Each elector cast one vote. Unlike most of the other states, Tasmania had not been split into individual single-member electorates. The other exception was the seven-member Division of South Australia. The statewide seats were abolished at a redistribution conducted two months prior to the 1903 election and were subsequently replaced with single-member divisions, one per displaced member, with each elector now casting a single vote.

Members
Sorted in order of votes received

The Division was split into five single-member seats at the 1903 election – Bass (Storrer, Protectionist), Darwin (O'Malley, Labour), Denison (Fysh, Protectionist), Franklin (McWilliams, Tariff) and Wilmot (Braddon, Free Trade).

Election results

Notes

1901 establishments in Australia
1903 disestablishments in Australia
Constituencies disestablished in 1903
Constituencies established in 1901
Former electoral divisions of Australia